82nd Brigade may refer to:

 82nd Mixed Brigade (Spain)
 82nd Brigade (United Kingdom)
 82nd Sustainment Brigade (United States)
 82nd Aviation Brigade (Yugoslavia)

See also

 82nd Division (disambiguation)
 82nd Regiment (disambiguation)